Ava Lazar (born January 1, 1955) is an American actress most notable for her role as the first Santana Andrade in NBC's soap opera Santa Barbara. She has been seen in numerous film and television roles. Some better known productions she appeared in include Rocky II, Fast Times at Ridgemont High, Scarface and Forever Young. Lazar is also a producer of three feature-length films, Nature of the Beast,  Mic and the Claw and Trafficking.

Lazar resides in Los Angeles and works as a life coach and creative consultant.

External links
 

1955 births
American television actresses
American soap opera actresses
Living people
21st-century American women